Grupo Salinas  is a corporate conglomerate formed in 2001 by several Mexican companies. The group consists of:
 TV Azteca - television and radio network
 Grupo Elektra - products include finance, home appliances, consumer electronics, furniture, motorcycles, mobile phones, computers and extended warranties
 Mazatlán F.C.- football club
 Telecosmo - internet service provider
 Italika - motorcycle manufacturer

Each of the Grupo Salinas companies operates independently, with its own management and board of directors.

History
Company history begins with a store called "Salinas y Rocha" founded in 1906 in Monterrey.

In 1950, Grupo Elektra began as a radio factory. Two years later, the company began manufacturing television sets and increased its workforce to 70 employees. Elektra began selling products directly to consumers in 1954. In 1957, Elektra retail stores incorporated credit programs. By 1968, Elektra had 12 stores in the region and by 1987, 59 stores. Elektra Group became a publicly traded company listed on the Bolsa Mexicana de Valores, the Mexican Stock Exchange.

In 1993, Grupo Elektra bought the Imevisión government television network and renamed it TV Azteca. TV Azteca created an initial public offering in 1997 on the Mexican and New York stock exchanges. In 2012, Grupo Elektra, a wholly owned subsidiary of Grupo Salinas, acquired payday lender Advance America for an estimated $780 million USD.

In 2003, Grupo Salinas purchased the telecommunications company Iusacell and the mobile phone company Unefón. Iusacell was sold to AT&T in 2014, and rebranded as AT&T Mexico. Unefón was also sold to AT&T Mexico.

In March 2019, Grupo Salinas made an investment of an undisclosed amount in One Web, a company developing and fielding a satellite internet constellation to deliver broadband internet services.
However, by March 2020 OneWeb found themselves in a cash crunch and was considering bankruptcy court protection during the coronavirus pandemic and market turmoil.

SEC charges against TV Azteca

See also 
 Hugo Salinas Price
 Ricardo Salinas Pliego

References

 
Conglomerate companies of Mexico
Companies based in Monterrey
Companies based in Nuevo León